Bhadmi, aka Bahadmi or Bahidmi, is a village and deh in Badin taluka of Badin District, Sindh. As of 2017, it has a population of 2,874, in 527 households. It is the seat of a tapedar circle, which also includes the villages of Chobandi, Dingher, Khalifa, Khudi, Lundo, Nareri, Palh, and Waghu Daho.

References 

Populated places in Badin District